The Amazing Race Australia 6 is the sixth season of the Australian reality television game show The Amazing Race Australia, an Australian spin-off of the American series The Amazing Race, and the third instalment of Network 10's iteration of the show.

Beau Ryan returned as the regular host with presenter Scott Tweedie guest hosting for Episodes 8-11 after Ryan caught COVID-19 during filming.

The sixth edition of the show premiered on 29 August 2022, with the finale airing on 9 October 2022.

Married couple Heath Curry & Toni Hilland were the winners of this season. They are the first male/female team to win in the Australian edition of The Amazing Race, with Toni also becoming the first female winner overall in the entire series.

Production

Development and filming

On 20 October 2021, Network 10 announced at upfronts that a new season was set to air in the second half of 2022.

Unlike the previous season which filmed solely in Australia due to COVID-19 restrictions, Beverley McGarvey, Executive Vice President and Chief Content Officer of Paramount Global Australia and New Zealand, stated that she intended for the show to resume travelling internationally again after the American version resumed international travel for their 33rd season in September 2021. On 2 February 2022, Daniel Monaghan, 10's Head of Programming, reaffirmed that the show would still be filming internationally as the Omicron surge began to subside.

Filming for the season began in March 2022. This season introduced a new twist involving two groups of ten teams starting The Amazing Race Australia separately and oblivious to the existence of the other, one in Sydney and one in Melbourne, and racing separately before converging in the next leg. Though described as a "world-first" and by Beau Ryan as "an Amazing Race franchise first," this split Starting Line twist previously appeared on the fourth and fifth seasons of HaMerotz LaMillion, the Israeli version of The Amazing Race, in 2014 and 2016 respectively. Unlike the Israeli version, the split Starting Lines were considered as two separate legs. On 5 March 2022, Beau Ryan was spotted in Chefchaouen, Morocco. On 20 March, TV Blackbox reported that a few crew members had tested positive for COVID-19 requiring some of the crew including Beau Ryan to self-isolate in hotels while the rest of the crew continued filming. From Legs 8 to 11, Scott Tweedie was brought in to replace Ryan as host while he was in isolation. According to TV Tonight, Tweedie was contacted prior to the season to potentially step in as host as part of the production's COVID-safe contingency plan. This season is the third time a show has changed hosts partway through filming after the first season of the Chinese edition and the sixth season of the Vietnamese edition. The show then travelled to İzmir, Turkey. Filming wrapped in April 2022. 

This season also travelled to Greece, Mexico and Colombia. Belize was also visited for the first time on any edition of The Amazing Race. This season was the second time The Amazing Race Australia visited all six inhabited continents after The Amazing Race Australia v New Zealand as well as the fourth time overall after The Amazing Race US 5 and The Amazing Race US 11.

Notable Pit Stop greeters for this season included Moroccan singer Dalal Barnoussi in Leg 3, Mister Supranational Greece 2021 Spyros Nikolaidis in Leg 4, Greek Winter Olympian Maria Ntanou in Leg 6, Akinrobotics' humanoid robot ADA in Leg 7, Belize City mayor Bernard Wagner in Leg 13 and boxers Yéssica Montiel and Katya Martel Ayala in Leg 17.

The Speed Bump which was not in the previous season, was brought back into this season for the teams that returned after self-isolating due to COVID-19. This season was the first season in the world to feature two no-rest legs back-to-back, as well as the first time in the Australian version to have a team be eliminated in a no-rest leg.

This is the first (and to date, currently the only) season in the Australian version not to feature an Intersection or a Fast Forward.

Casting
Casting for the season began in early November 2021. Contestants were required to be fully vaccinated with filming expected to occur from February 2022 over four to seven weeks.

Marketing
Isuzu, UBank, Kathmandu and Merrell served as sponsors for this season.

Cast
The cast was revealed on 22 August 2022. With 20 teams, this is the largest number of teams on any season of Amazing Race worldwide and tied with The Amazing Race: Family Edition for the most contestants at 40.

Future appearances
In 2023, Jake O'Brien and Holly MacAlpine appeared on the sixth season of MTV's Ex on the Beach.

Results
The following teams participated in the season, each listed along with leg placements and subtitles listed on the program. This table may not necessarily be reflective of all content broadcast on the program, owing to the inclusion or exclusion of some data. Placements are listed in finishing order.

A  placement with a dagger indicates that the team was eliminated. 
An  placement with a double-dagger indicates that the team was the last to arrive at a pit stop in a non-elimination leg.
 An italicized and underlined placement indicates that the team was the last to arrive at a pit stop, but there was no rest period at the pit stop and all teams were instructed to continue racing.
A  indicates that a team was temporarily removed from the competition due to COVID-19 and were subject to a Speed Bump during the leg in which they return. 
 A  indicates that the team used a U-Turn and a  indicates the team on the receiving end of a U-Turn.

Notes

Prizes
The first place team for most legs was awarded a prize.
Leg 1 – A holiday to the Mornington Peninsula, courtesy of Travel Victoria.
Leg 3 – A pair of Samsung Galaxy S22 Ultras, Galaxy Watches and Galaxy Buds.
Leg 5 – A  travel voucher, courtesy of 10 Travlr.
Leg 7 – A trip for two to Nickelodeon Land at Sea World in Gold Coast, Queensland, courtesy of Nickelodeon Travel.
Leg 9 – A six-night trip to Darwin, Northern Territory, Litchfield National Park and Kakadu National Park, courtesy of NT Tourism.
Leg 11 – A$5,000, courtesy of Andoo.
Leg 13 – A trip for two to Cradle Coast, Tasmania, courtesy of Intrepid Travel.
Leg 14 – A three-night holiday to Bali, Indonesia, courtesy of Bali Bible.
Leg 15 – Two Samsung 4K Frame TVs.
Leg 17 – A four-night holiday for two to Cairns and the Great Barrier Reef, courtesy of Crystalbrook Flynn and Quicksilver Group.
Leg 18 – A  RedBalloon voucher.
Leg 21 – , an Isuzu D-MAX and an Isuzu MU-X.

Race summary

Leg 1 (Australia → Morocco)

Airdate: 29 August 2022
Melbourne, Victoria, Australia (Flemington – Flemington Racecourse) (Starting Line for Group A)
 Melbourne (Melbourne Airport) to Ouarzazate, Morocco (Ouarzazate Airport)
Tifoultoute (Kasbah of Tifoultoute)
 Ouarzazate (Old Town)
 Ouarzazate (Atlas Studios)
Ksar Aït Benhaddou (Riverbed) 

This season's first Detour was a choice between In a Line or Off the Line. In In a Line, teams had to find a marked date vendor and order five dates from least expensive to most expensive to receive their next clue. In Off the Line, teams had to sort a pile of laundry by identifying five family name tags written in Arabic and fold each set of clothes to receive their next clue.

In this season's first Roadblock, one team member had to complete a series of challenges relating to the filming of The Mummy at Atlas Studios – mummifying themselves using bandages with assistance from their partner, walking on hot coals with a torch, carrying a spear across a balance beam and placing the spear on a statue, jumping through three fiery hoops and then smashing through a brick wall. Once they complete the stunt course within 45 seconds, they received their next clue. For safety reasons, racers had to retry if their bandages come off.

Additional tasks
At the Kasbah of Tifoultoute, teams had to identify five spices by taste (pepper, cumin, turmeric, ginger and paprika) to receive their next clue.
Following the Roadblock, teams had to find the 16 sphinxes at Atlas Studios, identify the king using a riddle and retrieve a rock below the king to receive their next clue.

Leg 2 (Australia → Morocco)
Airdate: 30 August 2022
Sydney, New South Wales, Australia (The Rocks – Hickson Road Reserve) (Starting Line for Group B)
 Sydney (Sydney Airport) to Marrakesh, Morocco (Marrakesh Menara Airport)
Marrakesh (Koutoubia Mosque)
 Marrakesh (Jemaa el-Fnaa or Souk Kharrazine El bali)
Marrakesh (Hotel Cecil) (Overnight Rest)
 Marrakesh (Souk Zitoun Place)
Marrakesh (Tannery Dar Dbagh Lakbira)
Marrakesh (Koutoubia Gardens) 

This leg's Detour was a choice between Splash or Dash. In Splash, teams had to find six water sellers wearing red and yellow tassels and total the brass cups that they were wearing (71) to receive their next clue. In Dash, teams had to find one of four lanterns flashing Morse code and translate the message (Enlightening) to receive their next clue.

In this leg's Roadblock, one team member had to eat three preserved lemons to receive their next clue. Racers would perform this task based on the order that they arrived at Hotel Cecil.

Additional tasks
At Koutoubia Mosque, teams had to load a cart with forty clay pots then transport them through the alleyways of the souk to a marked pottery shop to receive their next clue.
At Tannery Dar Dbagh Lakbira, teams had to scrape the hairs off of five goat hides and lay them out to dry to receive their next clue.

Leg 3 (Morocco)

Airdate: 31 August 2022
Chefchaouen (Spanish Mosque)
Chefchaouen (Plaza Uta el Hamman)
 Chefchaouen (La Botica de la Abuela Aladdin) (Overnight Rest)
Chefchaouen (Stairs)
Chefchaouen (Place El Haouta)
Chefchaouen (Restaurant Triana) 

In this leg's Roadblock, teams had to find La Botica de la Abuela Aladdin and choose a number. Entering the shop the next morning in groups of three, one team member had two minutes to search for a stack of Moroccan black soap marked with an Amazing Race flag; otherwise they had to go to the back of the queue. After memorising the stack, racers had to replicate it using the soap outside to receive their next clue.

Additional tasks
At Plaza Uta el Hamman, teams had to join a group of Gnawa dancers, and both team members had to use their heads to continuously twirl a tassel on fez for 90 seconds to receive their next clue.
At the stairs of Chefchaouen, teams had to use small paintbrushes to paint a step with blue colour wash and receive their next clue.
At Place El Haouta, teams had to choose a book with pictures of doors, search the labyrinthine streets for three doors from their book and write down the street numbers to receive their next clue. 

Additional note
At the Spanish Mosque, the two groups of nine teams merged before continuing the leg.

Leg 4 (Morocco → Greece)

Airdate: 4 September 2022
Chefchaouen (Place El Haouta – Chefchaouen Clock) (Pit Start)
 Tangier (Tangier Ibn Battouta Airport) to Athens, Greece (Athens International Airport)
Athens (Attica Grove Theatre)
Sounion (Temple of Poseidon)
 Athens (Technopolis)
Athens (Taverna Platanos)
Athens (Kotzia Square) 

This leg's Detour was a choice between Step Up or Step Down. In Step Up, teams had to learn and perform the changing of the guard routine of the Greek Presidential Guards, known as Evzones, to receive their next clue. In Step Down, teams had to make two pairs of classic Greek sandals then complete a three-legged race to receive their next clue.

Additional tasks
At Attica Grove Theatre, teams had to use a bow and arrow to hit the center of a target and receive their next clue.
At the Temple of Poseidon, teams had to memorise and then recite in unison the story of "The Tortoise and the Hare", one of Aesop's Fables, to receive their next clue from Poseidon.
At Taverna Platanos, teams had to eat an entire serving of spanakopita by feeding each other half to receive their next clue from head chef Nikos.

Additional note
Teams departed Athens International Airport in the order that they arrived at the previous Pit Stop.

Leg 5 (Greece)

Airdate: 5 September 2022
 Athens (Athens International Airport) to Kamari, Santorini (Santorini (Thira) International Airport) (Pit Start)
Vlychada (Vlychada Fishing Port) 
 Fira (Three Bells of Fira to Old Port)
Fira (Karavolades Stairs)
 Oia (Glitzy Windmill)
Oia (Church of Panagia Akathistos Hymn) 

This leg's Detour was a choice between Hustle or Bustle. In Bustle, teams had to repair  of damaged fishing net to receive their next clue.

In this leg's Roadblock, one team member had to correctly perform three out of five parkour moves to receive their next clue from Panos.

Additional task
From the Old Port of Fira, teams had to carry  of luggage to the top of the Karavolades Stairs while also leading a donkey to receive their next clue.

Additional note
During the Pit Stop, teams were flown to Santorini and began the leg outside of the airport.

Leg 6 (Greece)

Airdate: 6 September 2022
 Kamari (Santorini (Thira) International Airport) to Athens (Athens International Airport) 
Arachova (Egarsios Steps)
Arachova (Church of Saint George )
 Arachova (Clock Tower Overlook to Mount Parnassus)
 Arachova (Mount Parnassus to Arachova Outskirts)
Arachova (Church of Saint George) 

Additional tasks
At the Church of Saint George, teams had to dress as a bride and groom, then the groom had to pin  onto the bride using 50 euro notes. If the bride could spin three times without any notes falling off, then teams would receive their next clue.
At Mount Parnassus, teams had to board the chair lift and toss snow bombs until one landed in a target to receive their next clue. Due to blizzard conditions, this task was cancelled. Instead, teams had to build a snowman that was as tall as a shepherd's staff to receive their next clue.
After travelling by bus back to Arachova, teams had to run  from the drop off point to the Pit Stop.

Additional notes
Teams began climbing the Egarsios Steps in the order that they finished the previous leg.
Teams had to board one of two buses to Mount Parnassus. The first would depart after eight teams boarded, and the second would depart after all remaining teams boarded.

Leg 7 (Greece → Turkey)

Airdate: 11 September 2022
Arachova (Clock Tower Overlook) (Pit Start)
 Athens (Athens International Airport) to İzmir, Turkey (İzmir Adnan Menderes Airport)
İzmir (L'Agora Old Town Hotel)
İzmir (Dr. Mustafa Enver Bey Cd.)
 İzmir (Kokoreççi Asim Usta)
İzmir (Kemeraltı – Havra Sokağı to Kızlarağası Hanı )
İzmir (Cumhuriyet Meydanı) 

In this leg's Roadblock, one team member had to prepare kokoreç by tightly wrapping sheep intestines and stomach lining onto a skewer then eat a serving of kokoreç to receive their next clue.

Additional tasks
At L'Agora Old Town Hotel, teams had to learn and perform a Turkish belly dance, while dressed in traditional costumes and Isis wings, to receive their next clue.
On Dr. Mustafa Enver Bey Cd., one team member had to ride on a magic carpet, a carpet attached to an electric skateboard, through a marked street course, while their partner controlled the speed, to receive their next clue.
In the neighbourhood of Kemeraltı, both team members had to use poles to carry 100 gevreks from Havra Sokağı to a street vendor outside Kızlarağası Hanı without dropping the bread to receive their next clue.

Leg 8 (Turkey)

Airdate: 12 September 2022
İzmir (Konak Square – İzmir Clock Tower) (Pit Start)
Nazarköy (Kimiz Farm)
 Nazarköy (Workshop)
 Kula (Streets or Essanlar Konağı)
Kula (Gentlemen's House) 

In this leg's Roadblock, one team member had to make a nazar boncuğu, a glass talisman meant to ward off the evil eye, to receive their next clue from the master craftsman.

This leg's Detour was a choice between Street Procession or Sweet Obsession. In Street Procession, teams had to dress in festival attire, learn a Turkish folk dance and then perform the dance in a parade to receive their next clue. In Sweet Obsession, one team member had to wrap mesir paste sweets and toss them over their shoulder from a balcony. Their partner had to use an umbrella to catch 50 sweets before receiving their next clue.

Additional task
At the start of the leg, teams had to input coordinates into a mobile navigation app to find Kimiz Farm, where they had to move a Turkish oil wrestler out of ring within three minutes to receive their next clue.

Leg 9 (Turkey)

Airdate: 13 September 2022
Alaçatı (Town Square)
Alaçatı (Aya Yorgi Bay)  
Alaçatı (Bum Alaçatı)
Alaçatı (Alaçatı Değirmenleri) 

In this leg's Roadblock, which was presented to viewers as an additional task, one team member had to drive a JetCar, an amphibious sports car, through a marked course and perform a figure eight and two doughnuts within 90 seconds to receive their next clue. 

Additional tasks
In Alaçatı's town square, teams had to grab two Maraş ice cream cones undamaged from a teasing vendor to receive their next clue.
At Bum Alaçatı, teams had to use their faces to search a large bowl of icing sugar until they found a yellow Turkish delight to receive their next clue.

Leg 10 (Turkey → Colombia)

Airdate: 18 September 2022
Çeşme (Radisson Blu Resort & Spa) (Pit Start)
 İzmir (İzmir Adnan Menderes Airport) to Bogotá, Colombia (El Dorado International Airport)
Bogotá (Parque de los Periodistas  – Templete al Libertador)
Bogotá (La Candelaria – Calle del Embudo)
 Bogotá (Emerald District or Parque La Concordia)
Bogotá (Club De Tejo La 76)
Bogotá (Samper Mendoza Market) 
Bogotá (Parque Bicentenario) 

This leg's Detour was a choice between Sparkle or Spoke. In Sparkle, teams had to correctly sort real and synthetic emeralds to receive their next clue. In Spoke, teams had to play bike polo and score a goal against a defender within ten minutes to receive their next clue.

As a result of re-entering The Amazing Race Australia, Kathy & Chace and Stuart & Glennon had to complete a Speed Bump and purchase three additional herbs before travelling to the Pit Stop.

Additional tasks
At La Candelaria, teams had to use a phone that they picked up at Parque de los Periodistas to take selfies with three graffiti artworks made by street artist Guache that had to include the teams, the art and the artist's signature to receive their next clue.
At Club De Tejo La 76, teams had to play tejo by tossing iron discs until one landed on a gunpowder-filled target to receive their next clue.
At Samper Mendoza Market, teams had to purchase specified amounts of seven herbs for a home health remedy to receive their next clue. Teams had to order the ingredients in Spanish without showing the list to the vendors.

Leg 11 (Colombia)

Airdate: 19 September 2022
 Bogotá (El Dorado International Airport) to Medellín (José María Córdova International Airport)
Guatapé (El Peñól)
 Medellín (Finca Torremolino)
 Medellín (Comuna 13)
Medellín (Comuna 13 – Fonda Familia 13) 

This leg's Detour was a choice between Brew or Bunch. In Brew, teams had to search through a  sack of coffee beans and find five beans that have letters that spell "AROMA" to receive their next clue. In Bunch, teams had to collect flowers and recreate a flower arrangement called a silleta, commonly seen during Festival of the Flowers. After placing the silleta on a team member's back, teams would receive their next clue.

In this leg's Roadblock, one team member had to eat an eyeball salad and tripa de cerda, which includes pig intestines and tongue, to receive their next clue.

Additional task
At El Peñól, teams had to climb over 700 stairs to reach their next clue at the summit.

Additional note
After flying to Medellín, teams exited the airport in the order that they finished the previous leg.

Leg 12 (Colombia)

Airdate: 20 September 2022
 Medellín (José María Córdova International Airport) to Cartagena (Rafael Núñez International Airport)
La Boquilla (La Perla Negra)
La Boquilla (La Boquilla Community Centre)
Cartagena (Parque San Diego)
Cartagena (Parque de Bolívar )
Cartagena (Castillo San Felipe de Barajas) 

Additional tasks
At La Perla Negra, teams had to make ten arepas and then deliver them to the community centre to receive their next clue from charity worker Marina.
At Parque San Diego, teams had to place a bowl of fruit on a team member's head, much like the Palenquero people, and sell COL$20,000 (approximately ) worth of fruit to receive their next clue from Eva.
At Parque de Bolívar, teams had to learn and perform a Colombian-style salsa to receive their next clue from José.

Additional notes
During the Pit Stop, teams were flown to Cartagena and began the leg outside of the airport.
To check into the Pit Stop, teams had to follow a marked path through a tunnel.

Leg 13 (Colombia → Belize)

Airdate: 25 September 2022
 Cartagena (Rafael Núñez International Airport) to Belize City, Belize (Philip S. W. Goldson International Airport) or Cancún, Mexico (Cancún International Airport)
Rockstone Pond (Belize Exotic Adventures)
 Belize City (Travellers Liquors Distillery)
Belize City (Best Western Plus Belize Biltmore Plaza) (Overnight Rest)
La Democracia (Belize Zoo)
 Belize City (Dario's Meat Pies or Digi Park)
Belize City (Baron Bliss Lighthouse) 

In this leg's Roadblock, one team member had to clean 36 recycled rum bottles and then place them on drying racks to receive their next clue.

This leg's Detour was a choice between Heat or Beat. Once teams arrived at a task, they could not switch. In Heat, teams had to eat 25 hot meat pies to receive their next clue. Teams had to put the pot's lid back on after grabbing a pie; otherwise they had to start over. In Beat, teams had to learn to play "Waltzing Matilda" on the steelpan then play in unison with the Pantempters Steel Orchestra to receive their next clue from the bandleader.

Additional tasks
After landing in Belize, teams had to use a provided TomTom to direct a driver to Belize Exotic Adventures, where they had to search for a bag of firewood and a bag of cashew nuts. Then, teams had to roast and shell the nuts to receive their next clue.
At Belize Zoo, teams had to provide a tapir with its breakfast then drain, clean and refill the tapir's waste pool to receive their next clue from a zookeeper. As tapirs can become aggressive, teams could only perform this task while they were eating.

Leg 14 (Belize)

Airdate: 26 September 2022
Belize City (Battlefield Park) (Pit Start)
Santa Cruz (Santa Cruz School) 

 San Ignacio (Cahal Pech)
San Ignacio (Hawkesworth Bridge)
Cayo District (Xunantunich) 

As a result of re-entering The Amazing Race Australia, Fliss & Tottie, Jodie & Claire, Kelly & Georgia and Tiffany & Cynthia had to complete a Speed Bump, where they had to clean 10 items of school furniture before they could continue racing.

This leg's Detour was a choice between Score or Solve. In Score, teams had to play pok-a-tok and score a goal by getting a ball through a ring without using their hands to receive their next clue. Teams had to go to the back of the queue if they missed after six attempts. In Solve, teams had to solve a puzzle by spinning 36 movable pieces, each of which had Maya numerals, so that each number appeared only once in any direction to receive their next clue. The blocks with red marks were already in the correct position.

Additional tasks
At Santa Cruz School, teams had to weed a plotted section of a greenhouse, plant ginger, lemongrass and chili so that they matched an example plot and repair a section of roof and siding to receive their next clue from the school principal.
At Hawkesworth Bridge, teams had to memorise the 18 months on a Maya calendar. Then, teams had to paddle a canoe down the Macal River, much like during La Ruta Maya, find 18 engraved stones and place them in chronological order on a blank calendar to receive their next clue.

Additional note
Teams began the leg by departing Battlefield Park at the same time.

Leg 15 (Belize)

Airdate: 27 September 2022
Belize City (Radisson Fort George) (Pit Start)
 Belize City (Radisson Fort George Marina) to Caye Caulker (Feeding Dock)
  Caye Caulker (Shark Ray Alley)
  Caye Caulker (Da Real Macaw or The Lazy Lizard)
 Caye Caulker (Il Pellicano Cucina Italiana) 
 Caye Caulker (The Split)
Caye Caulker (Northside Beach Bar) 

In this leg's first Roadblock, one team member had to swim in shark-inhabited waters and find a conch marked with Amazing Race colours to receive their next clue.

This leg's Detour was a choice between Twirl It or Twerk It. In Twirl It, teams had to braid a woman's hair to make eight cornrows and receive their next clue. In Twerk It, teams had to learn and perform a soca dance to receive their next clue.

In this leg's second Roadblock, one team member, regardless of who performed the first Roadblock, had to slowly pedal a bike for 150 seconds to the end of a short, bumpy road to receive their next clue.

As a result of re-entering The Amazing Race Australia, Lauren & Steph had to complete a Speed Bump, where the team member who didn't perform the second Roadblock had to complete it before they could continue racing.

Additional task
Once on Caye Caulker, teams had to feed tarpons to receive their next clue.

Additional note
At the start of the leg, teams had to run to a marina to claim one of two boats, each of which carried four teams and departed 15 minutes apart, to Caye Caulker.

Leg 16 (Belize → Mexico)

Airdate: 28 September 2022
 Belize City to Campeche City, Mexico (Salon Rincón Colonial)
Campeche City (Parque San Roman)
Campeche City (Calle 59) (Overnight Rest)
Sotuta de Peón (Hacienda Sotuta de Peón)
 Sotuta de Peón (Sotuta Cenote)
Sotuta de Peón (Hacienda Sotuta de Peón) 

In this leg's Roadblock, one team member had to freedive to the bottom of a cenote to retrieve their next clue.

Additional tasks
At Salon Rincón Colonial, one team member was blindfolded, then their partner would feed them crickets, a desert scorpion, a tarantula and a hissing cockroach. After eating, they then had to correctly identify all four to receive their next clue. If any were wrong, both team members had to eat a piece of hot pepper before trying again.
At Parque San Roman, teams had to use a large slingshot to shoot balls at two piñatas. After both piñatas dropped, teams had to use sticks to break open the piñatas and find the one Amazing Race coloured lolly that they could exchange for their next clue.
On Calle 59, teams had to memorise the colours of 25 houses on one side of the street then place colour swatches on a board in the correct order to receive their next clue.
At Hacienda Sotuta de Peón, teams had to carry two bundles of henequen to a factory, comb the plant's fibers then spin the fibers into  of rope to receive their next clue.

Leg 17 (Mexico)

Airdate: 29 September 2022
Mérida (Palacio Municipal de Mérida) 
 Mérida (Taqueria La Lupita or Parque de Santa Lucía)
Mérida (Cementerio General)
 Mérida (Calle 64)
Mérida (El Minaret) 

This season's final Detour was a choice between Cactus of Chorus. In Cactus, teams had to make five cactus tacos to receive their next clue. In Chorus, teams had to sing "La Cucaracha" with a mariachi band to receive their next clue.

In this leg's Roadblock, one team member had to count the number of light pink-coloured papel picado (79) strung among 3,000 to receive their next clue.

Additional task
At Cementerio General, each team member had to paint a Day of the Dead calavera design onto their partner's face to receive their next clue.

Leg 18 (Mexico)

Airdate: 2 October 2022
Izamal (Convento de San Antonio de Padua )
Izamal (Intersection of Calles 24 & 31)
 Sudzal (Calle 5)
Ekʼ Balam (Cenote X'Canché) 

In this leg's Roadblock, one team member had to complete a flower embroidery to receive their next clue.

Additional tasks
At Convento de San Antonio de Padua, teams had to learn and perform a Yucatecan dance, which involved balancing a beer bottle on their heads, to receive their next clue.
After the dance task, teams had to count the number of interior and exterior arches in the convent (24 & 31), travel by horse-drawn carriage to the street intersection with the same numbers and knock on a door to receive their next clue.
At Cenote X'Canché, teams had to ride a zip line, drop into the cenote and swim to the Pit Stop.

Leg 19 (Mexico → Australia)

Airdate: 3 October 2022
Valladolid (Real Hispano) (Pit Start)
 Mérida (Mérida International Airport) to Perth, Western Australia, Australia (Perth Airport)
 Perth (Jandakot – Jandakot Airport (Royal Aero Club))
Perth (City Centre – Swan Bells Tower)
Perth (City Centre – Murray Street Mall (Ready Team One))
Perth (Burswood – Optus Stadium)
Perth (East Perth – Perth Mint) 

In this leg's Roadblock, one team member had to memorise Australian aviation trivia during an aerobatics flight. After returning to the ground, they had to correctly answer five questions to receive their next clue. The questions were: (1) What is the minimum altitude you need to be at to perform aerial aerobatics? (3,000 feet); (2) What percentage of airspace does Australia control? (11%); (3) How many years ago did the first air mail run start in Australia? (100); (4) In which country was the black box invented? (Australia); (5) What was the name of the aircraft used to deliver sugar cubes containing polio vaccine to the Outback? (Sugar Bird).

Additional tasks
At Swan Bells Tower, teams had to ring two bells simultaneously four times within four minutes to receive their next clue.
At Ready Team One, teams had to play a virtual reality game and kill an alien leader to receive their next clue.
At Optus Stadium, teams had to hang upside-down and memorise the six seasons of the Noongar calendar (Birak, Bunaru, Djeran, Makuru, Djilba and Kambrang) to receive their next clue.

Leg 20 (Australia)

Airdate: 4 October 2022
Fremantle (Fremantle Town Hall) (Pit Start)
 Fremantle (Victoria Quay) to Rottnest Island (Rottnest Island Ferry Jetty)
 Rottnest Island (Rottnest Island Airport – Geronimo Skydive)
Rottnest Island (Army Jetty)
 Rottnest Island (Rottnest Island Ferry Jetty) to Fremantle (Victoria Quay)
Fremantle (Gage Roads Brewing Company)
Fremantle (Round House)
Fremantle (Fremantle Fishing Boat Harbour – Statue of Bon Scott)
Fremantle (South Mole Lighthouse) 

In this leg's Roadblock, both team members had to travel by Segway to the island's airfield, where one team member had to perform a  skydive and reunite with their partner at Army Jetty to receive their next clue.

Additional tasks
At Gage Roads Brewing Company, teams had to carry  of malt to a loading dock. Then, both team members had to drink a yard glass of non-alcoholic beer as a nod to former Prime Minister Bob Hawke to receive their next clue.
At Round House, one team member would be locked in a pillory and catch a piece a bread and a piece of spam tossed to them by their partner before washing them down with lime juice. Teams then had to ring the curfew bell to receive their next clue.

Additional note
At the start of the leg, teams boarded a ferry to Rottnest Island and received their Roadblock clue on the ferry. Teams were released from the ferry in the order that they finished the previous leg.

Leg 21 (Australia)

Airdate: 9 October 2022
 Perth (Perth Airport) to Broome (Broome International Airport)
Broome (Chinatown – Sun Picture Gardens)
 Waterbank (Willie Creek Pearl Farm)
Waterbank (Willie Creek Sandbank)
Broome (Mangroves)
 Broome (Mantra Frangipani and Simpsons Beach)
Broome (Gantheaume Point) 

In this leg's first Roadblock, one team member had to collect a panel of eight oysters, submerge them in water, coax four to open and insert a peg. If one had a pearl, teams would receive their next clue.

In this season's final Roadblock, one team member, regardless of who performed the first Roadblock, had to collect a bucket and spade from Mantra Frangipani then drive to Simpsons Beach. Then, they had to search through 200 sandcastles until they found a button to receive their next clue.

Additional tasks
At Sun Picture Gardens, teams had to feed each other sweet and sour pork using  chopsticks to receive their next clue.
At Willie Creek Sandbank, one team member had to write the Yawuru word for dust storm (Gujuguju) in the sand, and their partner had to identify the word from a helicopter within three minutes to receive their next clue.
In the mangroves, teams had to find 20 snails, cook two using Aboriginal methods and eat them to receive their next clue.
At Gantheaume Point, teams had to arrange six replica clock towers based on the order that they visited them. Teams that were observant would have seen "TIME" in all capital letters in several clues during the season. The correct order was: Chefchaouen Clock, Arachova Clock Tower, İzmir Clock Tower, Supreme Court of Belize, Palacio Municipal de Mérida and Fremantle Town Hall. Once correct, teams would receive six clock faces representing the times that they were at each clock tower. After placing the times in leg order, they had to create a six-digit code (teams had to add two-digit times to create one number) and unlock their final clue.

Reception

Ratings
Rating data is from OzTAM and represents the viewership from the 5 largest Australian metropolitan centres (Sydney, Melbourne, Brisbane, Perth and Adelaide).

References

External links

Australia 6
2022 Australian television seasons
Television series impacted by the COVID-19 pandemic
Television shows filmed in Australia
Television shows filmed in Morocco
Television shows filmed in Greece
Television shows filmed in Turkey
Television shows filmed in Colombia
Television shows filmed in Belize
Television shows filmed in Mexico